Bronius Markauskas (born 5 November 1960) is a Lithuanian politician. He served as Minister of Agriculture in the cabinet of Prime Minister Saulius Skvernelis from 13 December 2016 to 14 May 2018. Giedrius Surplys was appointed as his successor.

References 

Living people
1960 births
Place of birth missing (living people)
21st-century Lithuanian politicians
Ministers of Agriculture of Lithuania
Lithuanian Farmers and Greens Union politicians
Members of the Seimas
Kaunas University of Technology alumni